The Men's dual moguls competition at the FIS Freestyle Ski and Snowboarding World Championships 2021 was held on 9 March 2021.

Results

Finals

Top half

Section 1

Section 2

Bottom half

Section 3

Section 4

References

Men's dual moguls